

Australia vs England

Canada vs Pakistan

Pakistan vs Australia

Canada vs England

Canada vs Australia

England vs Pakistan

References

External links
 Cricket World Cup 1979 from Cricinfo

Group A, 1979 Cricket World Cup
Cricket World Cup Group A, 1979